Raguvėlė Manor (or Komarai Manor) is a former residential manor in Raguvėlė village, Anykščiai district.

References

Manor houses in Lithuania
Classicism architecture in Lithuania